The North American Central Time Zone (CT or C) is a time zone in parts of Canada, the United States, Mexico, Central America, some Caribbean islands, and part of the Eastern Pacific Ocean.

Central Standard Time (CST) is six hours behind Coordinated Universal Time (UTC). During summer, most of the zone uses daylight saving time (DST), and changes to Central Daylight Time (CDT) which is five hours behind UTC.

The largest city in the Central Time Zone is Mexico City; the Mexico City metropolitan area is the largest metropolitan area in the zone and in North America.

Regions using (North American) Central Time

Canada

The province of Manitoba is the only province or territory in Canada that observes Central Time in all areas.

The following Canadian provinces and territories observe Central Time in the areas noted, while their other areas observe Eastern Time:
 Nunavut (territory): western areas (most of Kivalliq Region and part of Qikiqtaaluk Region)
 Ontario (province): a portion of the northwest bordering southeastern Manitoba, in and around Kenora.

Also, most of the province of Saskatchewan is on Central Standard Time year-round, never adjusting for Daylight Saving Time. Major exceptions include Lloydminster, a city situated on the boundary between Alberta and Saskatchewan.  The city charter stipulates that it shall observe Mountain Time and DST, putting the community on the same time as all of Alberta, including the major cities of Calgary and Edmonton.  As a result, during the summer, clocks in the entire province match those in Alberta, but during the winter, clocks in most of the province match those in Manitoba.

United States

Ten states are contained entirely in the Central Time Zone:
 Alabama
 Arkansas
 Illinois
 Iowa
 Louisiana
 Minnesota
 Mississippi
 Missouri
 Oklahoma
 Wisconsin

Five states are split between the Central Time Zone and the Mountain Time Zone:
 Kansas: all except for Sherman, Wallace, Greeley, and Hamilton counties
 Nebraska: eastern two thirds
 North Dakota: all except for southwest regions, south part of McKenzie County, and the majority of Dunn County and far western Sioux County
 South Dakota: eastern half
 Texas: all except for El Paso, Hudspeth, and northwestern Culberson counties 

Five states are split between the Central Time Zone and the Eastern Time Zone:
 Florida: most of Florida Panhandle west of the Apalachicola River; Franklin County west of the Apalachicola River and parts of Gulf County are in the Central Time Zone
 Indiana: northwest (Gary) and southwest (Evansville) regions 
 Kentucky: western half
 Michigan: Gogebic, Iron, Dickinson, and Menominee counties
 Tennessee: West Tennessee and Middle Tennessee, including the major cities of Nashville and Memphis
Additionally, Phenix City, Alabama, and several nearby communities in Russell County, Alabama, unofficially observe Eastern Time. This is due to their close proximity to Columbus, Georgia, which is on Eastern Time.

Although legally located within the Central Time Zone, Kenton, Oklahoma—located to the adjacent east of the defined border of the Central and Mountain time zones (at the Oklahoma−New Mexico state line)—unofficially observes Mountain Time. This is reportedly because most people who interact with the town reside in either New Mexico or Colorado.

Mexico

Most of Mexico—roughly the eastern three-fourths—lies in the Central Time Zone, except for five northwestern states (Baja California, Baja California Sur, Sinaloa, Sonora, and most of Nayarit) and one southeastern state (Quintana Roo).

The federal entities of Mexico that observe Central Time:

 Aguascalientes
 Campeche
 Chihuahua
 Coahuila
 Colima – except for the Revillagigedo Islands, in which the inner islands use Mountain Time and the outer island uses Pacific Time
 Chiapas
 Durango
 Guanajuato
 Guerrero
 Hidalgo
 Jalisco
 Mexico City
 Michoacán
 Morelos
 Nayarit – *only the municipality of Bahía de Banderas, rest of the state uses Mountain Time
 Nuevo León
 Oaxaca
 Puebla
 Querétaro
 San Luis Potosí
 State of Mexico
 Tabasco
 Tamaulipas
 Tlaxcala
 Veracruz
 Yucatán
 Zacatecas

Central America
Belize, Costa Rica, El Salvador, Guatemala, Honduras, and Nicaragua all use Central Standard Time year-round.

Eastern Pacific islands and other areas

The Galápagos Islands in Ecuador uses Central Standard Time all year-round; the remainder of Ecuador uses Eastern Standard Time. Both Easter Island and Salas y Gómez Island in Chile uses Central Standard Time during the Southern Hemisphere winter and Central Daylight Time during the Southern Hemisphere summer; the remainder of Chile uses Atlantic Standard Time and Atlantic Daylight Time.

Central Daylight Time

Daylight saving time (DST) is in effect in much of the Central time zone between mid-March and early November. The modified time is called "Central Daylight Time" (CDT) and is UTC−05:00. In Canada, Saskatchewan does not observe a time change. One reason for Saskatchewan's lack of a time change is that the 105th parallel of longitude, the start point for the Mountain Time Zone, divides the province into approximately equal portions. The province elected to move onto "permanent" daylight saving by being part of the Central Time Zone. The only exception is the region immediately surrounding the Saskatchewan side of the bi-provincial city of Lloydminster, which has chosen to use Mountain Time with DST, synchronizing its clocks with those of Alberta.

In those areas of the Canadian and American time zones that observe DST, beginning in 2007, the local time changes at 02:00 local standard time to 03:00 local daylight time on the second Sunday in March and returns at 02:00 local daylight time to 01:00 local standard time on the first Sunday in November. Mexico decided not to go along with this change and observes their  from the first Sunday in April to the last Sunday in October. In December 2009, the Mexican Congress allowed ten border cities, eight of which are in states that observe Central Time, to adopt the U.S. daylight time schedule effective in 2010. October 2022, was the last CDT in Mexico, as they abolished DST. In the US, the Sunshine Protection Act is proposed legislation that would permanently end time seasonal changes.

Alphabetical list of major Central Time Zone metropolitan areas

Acapulco, Guerrero
Aguascalientes, Aguascalientes
Amarillo, Texas
Antigua Guatemala
Austin, Texas
Baton Rouge, Louisiana
Beaumont/Port Arthur, Texas
Belize City, Belize
Belmopan, Belize
Birmingham, Alabama
Bismarck, North Dakota
Bloomington, Illinois
Bowling Green, Kentucky
Brandon, Manitoba
Cedar Rapids, Iowa
Champaign, Illinois
Chicago, Illinois
Clarksville, Tennessee
Comarca Lagunera (Torreón, Gómez Palacio, Lerdo)
Columbia, Missouri
Cuernavaca, Morelos
Dallas–Fort Worth, Texas
Des Moines, Iowa
Enid, Oklahoma
Evansville, Indiana
Fargo, North Dakota
Fort Smith, Arkansas
Fort Walton Beach, Florida
Grand Forks, North Dakota
Grand Rapids, Manitoba
Green Bay, Wisconsin
Guadalajara, Jalisco
Guatemala City, Guatemala
Houston, Texas
Huntsville, Alabama
Iowa City, Iowa
Jackson, Mississippi
Jackson, Tennessee
Janesville, Wisconsin
Jonesboro, Arkansas 
Joplin, Missouri
Kansas City, Missouri-Kansas
Killeen-Temple-Fort Hood, Texas
Lafayette, Louisiana
Lawrence, Kansas
León, Guanajuato
Lincoln, Nebraska
Little Rock, Arkansas
Lubbock, Texas
Madison, Wisconsin
Managua, Nicaragua
Memphis, Tennessee
Mérida, Yucatán
Mexico City
Midland/Odessa, Texas
Milwaukee, Wisconsin
Minneapolis-St. Paul, Minnesota
Mobile, Alabama
Monroe, Louisiana
Monterrey, Nuevo León
Montgomery, Alabama
Morelia, Michoacán
Nashville, Tennessee
New Orleans, Louisiana
Normal, Illinois
Northwest Arkansas
Oklahoma City, Oklahoma
Omaha, Nebraska
Panama City, Florida
Pensacola, Florida
Peoria, Illinois
Puebla, Puebla
Quad Cities, Iowa/Illinois
Racine, Wisconsin
Red Lake, Ontario
Regina, Saskatchewan
Rockford, Illinois
Rochester, Minnesota
Sioux City, Iowa
Sioux Falls, South Dakota
St. Louis, Missouri
San Antonio, Texas
San José, Costa Rica
San Luis Potosí City
San Pedro Sula, Honduras
San Salvador, El Salvador
Santiago de Querétaro, Querétaro
Saskatoon, Saskatchewan
Shreveport–Bossier City, Louisiana
Springfield, Illinois
Springfield, Missouri
Tampico, Tamaulipas
Tegucigalpa, Honduras
Thompson, Manitoba
Toluca, Estado de México
Topeka, Kansas
Tuscaloosa, Alabama
Tulsa, Oklahoma
Wichita, Kansas
Wichita Falls, Texas
Winnipeg, Manitoba
Zacatecas, Zacatecas

See also
Effects of time zones on North American broadcasting

References

External links
 Hismaime zones C conversion 
 Official times across Canada

Time zones
Time in Canada
Time in Mexico
Time zones in the United States